Keshabpur is an upazila of Jessore District in the Division of Khulna, Bangladesh.

Geography
It has 37,513 individual households and a total area of 258.53 km2. The distance from Jessore City is 32 km.

Keshabpur Upazila of Jessore district has an area of 258.53 km2 and is bounded by Manirampur Upazila to the north,Kapotaksha River, Tala and Dumuria Upazila to the south, Dumuria Upazila to the east, and Kalaroa Upazila and Kapotaksha River to the west. The main rivers are Harihar, Kapotaksha River and Buribhdra.

Demographics
According to the 2011 Bangladesh census, Keshabpur had a population of 253,291. Males constituted 50.00% of the population and females 50.00%. Muslims formed 82.08% of the population, Hindus 17.73%, Christians 0.09% and others 0.10%. Kesabpur had a literacy rate of 55.23% for the population 7 years and above.

According to the 1991 Bangladesh census, Keshabpur had a population of 200,229. Males constituted 51.16% of the population, and females 48.84%. This Upazila's population aged 18 or over was 103,794. Keshabpur has an average literacy rate of 55.5% (in those aged seven and above), while the national average is 68.4%.

Points of interest
Sagardari is a village in the Keshabpur Upazila, built on the bank of the Kopotakho River, where the poet Michael Madhusudan Dutt was born on the 25 January 1824. Tourists from all over the world visit "Modhu Palli" and "Modhu Mela", a fair in memory of Modhusudan's Birthday, is held every year.

Archaeological heritage and relics include remnants of the Bharatvhainabazar Rajbari (দেউলটি গুপ্ত যুগের খ্রিষ্টীয় ২য় শতকে নির্মিত হয়েছে বলে অনুমান করা হয় ), the residence of Nawab Mir Jumla (17th century), the residence of poet Madhusudan Dutt at Sagardari, and remnants of an ancient fort at village Bidhyanandikathi.

There is a memorial to the War of Liberation.
 Keshabpur Press Club Establish 1978

The Home of Dhiraj Bhattacharya. He was born in a zamindar family of Panjia village, near Jessore, in British India. His father name was Lalit Mohan Bhattacharya. He entered Mitra Institution, Kolkata and passed matriculation in 1923. He joined the Ashutosh College to study literature but could not finish his studies. He joined the police service before becoming an actor.

Administration
Keshabpur thana was turned into an upazila in 1983.

Keshabpur Upazila is divided into Keshabpur Municipality and eleven union parishads: Bidyanandakati, Hasanpur, Gaurighona, Keshabpur, Majidpur, Mangalkot, Panjia, Sagardari, Sufalakati, Satbaria and Trimohini. The union parishads are subdivided into 142 mauzas and 135 villages.

Keshabpur Municipality is subdivided into 9 wards and 14 mahallas.

The area of the town is 18.46 km2. The town has a population of 26,229,male 13,141, female 13,088. Population density is 1121 per km2. The literacy rate within the town is 32.9%.

Education
Educational institutions: college 5, high school 32, madrasa 97, government primary school 70, non-government primary school 85. Noted educational institutions: Keshabpur Degree College (1967), Keshabpur Pilot School & College,Haji Abdul Motaleb Womens College, Keshabpur Girls' School, Sagardari Michael Madhusadan Institution, Sagardari A. S. K. Abu Sharab Sadik vocational and Commerce College, Sagardari Govt technical school, Sagardari Alim Madrasa, Mehepur Dakil Madrasa, Meherpur govt primary school, Gobindapur Govt primary school, Panjia High School, Panjia Degree College, Biddyanandkati Rasbihari Institution, Narayanpur High School, Batikhula Dakil Madrasha, Batikhula primary School, Mongolkote High School, Shikarpur Secondary High School.

References

External links
 Upazila Administration

Upazilas of Jessore District
Jashore District
Khulna Division